Weyanoke is an unincorporated community in Mercer County, West Virginia, United States.

The community was named after the Weyanoke Indians, perhaps via the local Weyanoke Coal Company.

References

Unincorporated communities in Mercer County, West Virginia
Unincorporated communities in West Virginia